Neocollyris major is a species of ground beetle in the genus Neocollyris in the family Carabidae. It was described by Pierre André Latreille in 1822.

References

Major, Neocollyris
Beetles described in 1822